Smudging, or other rites involving the burning of sacred herbs (e.g., white sage) or resins, is a ceremony practiced by some Indigenous peoples of the Americas. While it bears some resemblance to other ceremonies and rituals involving smoke (e.g., Australian smoking ceremony, some types of saining) from other world cultures, notably those that use smoke for spiritual cleansing or blessing, the purposes and particulars of the ceremonies, and the substances used, can vary widely among tribes, bands, and nations, and even more so among different world cultures. In traditional communities, Elders maintain the protocols around these ceremonies and provide culturally specific guidance. The smudging ceremony, by various names, has been appropriated by others outside of the Indigenous communities as part of New Age or commercial practices, which has also led to the over-harvesting of some of the plants used in ceremonies. The appropriation and the over-harvesting have both been protested by Indigenous people in the US and Canada.

Native American traditions
In some Indigenous American and Canadian ceremonies, certain herbs are traditionally used to purify or bless people and places. For instance, some cultures use the smoke of burning red cedar as part of their particular purification and healing ceremonies. Sometimes this is done in hospitals to "cleanse and repel evil influence." However, the same herbs that are burned by one culture may be taboo to burn in another, or they may be used for a completely different purpose. When specific herbs are burned ceremonially, this may or may not be called "smudging", depending on the culture. Traditionally, when gathering herbs for ceremonial use, care is taken to determine the time of day, month, or year when the herbs should be collected; for example, at dawn or evening, at certain phases of the moon, or according to yearly cycles.  Gertrude Allen, a Lumbee, reported that her father, an expert in healing with plants, stated that sage varies in potency at different times of the year.

While sage is commonly associated with smudging and several Native American, First Nations, Inuit or Métis cultures may use forms of sage that are local to their region, the use of sage is neither universal, nor as widespread as many believe. Its use in regions that have not traditionally used sage for purification is largely a result of the Pan-Indian movement, rather than traditional practice. In some cases it may be in direct opposition to what is traditional for that region. Likewise, not all Native American or Indigenous Canadian cultures that burn herbs or resins for ceremony call this practice "smudging".

While using various forms of scent and scented smoke (such as incense) in religious and spiritual rites is an element common to many different cultures worldwide, the details, reasons, desired effects, and spiritual meanings are usually unique to the specific cultures in question.

Controversy
While white sage is not currently on the endangered list, the over-harvesting by commercial sellers has severely depleted the amount available, and many fear that it is soon to be endangered or extinct. Native ceremonial people have reported that visits to their traditional harvesting sites in recent years have found them bare, their personal supply of sage taken from the tribe forever by new age, hippie, and other commercial poachers who have "destroyed" the sites by ripping the plants up by their roots.

Some of the terminology in use among non-Indigenous people, such as the American English term "smudge stick" is usually found in use among those who imitate what they believe are Native American sacred ceremonies. However, the herbs used in commercial "smudge sticks" or "sage bundles," and the rituals performed with them by non-Natives, are rarely the actual materials or ceremonies used by traditional Native Americans. Use of these objects have also been adopted in some forms into a number of modern belief systems, including many forms of New Age and eclectic Neopagan spirituality. This has been protested against by Native activists as a form of cultural misappropriation, and care is needed to distinguish smudging from other practices involving smoke, which have completely different cultural protocols.

Smudging "kits" are often sold commercially, by companies such as Anthropologie, Sephora, World Market, and Walmart, despite traditional prohibitions against the sale of spiritual medicines like white sage. These may include bundles of a single herb or a combination of several different herbs; often these herbs are not found bundled together in traditional use, and their use is not universal to all, or even most, Native cultures. In some Native American cultures the burning of these herbs is prohibited. Other commercial items may contain herbs not native to North America, or not indigenous to the region where they are being used, as well as substances that are toxic when burnt. 

Native American and First Nations students in college dorms have at times faced harassment and been forbidden from burning herbs for ceremonial reasons due to university fire prevention policies that prohibit the burning of candles or incense in college dorm rooms. This has raised issues around the religious freedom of Native Americans. In another account, a Native American in Cincinnati became ordained by the Universal Life Church in order to fulfill the requirement that only clergy members could perform smudging ceremonies as part of the prayer ritual for other Native Americans in area hospitals.

Use of smoke in other cultures
Other cultures worldwide may burn herbs or incense for spiritual purposes, such as in smoking ceremonies, some forms of saining, or practices involving the use of incense censers. However, these cultures have their own practices, as well as their own beliefs about these ritual actions and the ritual use of smoke.

See also

Moxibustion
Plastic shaman

References

External links
 Elder furious Alberta department store selling sweetgrass - Video
 Sephora’s “Starter Witch Kit” and Spiritual Theft - Adrienne Keene (Cherokee) of Native Appropriations on commercial "smudge kits"
 Stokes, DaShanne. 2001. "Sage, Sweetgrass, and the First Amendment." The Chronicle of Higher Education, May 18, pp. B16.

First Nations culture
Herbs
Incense
Native American religion
Spiritual practice
Traditions involving fire